The South Aral Sea was a lake in the basin of the former Aral Sea which formed in 1987 when that body divided in two, due to diversion of river inflow for agriculture. In 2003, the South Aral Sea itself split into eastern and western basins, the Eastern Sea and the West Aral Sea, connected by a narrow channel (channel bed at an elevation of ) that balanced surface levels but did not allow mixing, and in 2005 the North Aral Sea was dammed to prevent the collapse of its fisheries, cutting off the only remaining inflow to the southern lakes. In 2008, the Eastern Sea split again, and in May 2009 had almost completely dried out, leaving only the small permanent Barsakelmes Lake between the Northern and Western Seas and increasing the expanse of the Aralkum desert. In 2010, it was partially filled again by meltwater, and by 2014 was once again dry. The West Aral Sea has some replenishment from groundwater in the northwest, and so is likely to avoid desiccation.

Background
The Aral Sea began shrinking in the 1960s, when the Soviet Union decided that the two rivers feeding it, the Amu Darya and the Syr Darya, would be diverted in order to irrigate cotton and food crops in Kazakhstan and Uzbekistan. In 1987, due to an accelerated loss of water, the Aral Sea was split into northern and southern parts; the northern part is the current North Aral Sea.

Salinity
In 2007, the western basin had a salinity of 70 g/L and the eastern basin 100 g/L. Once the water level falls below the connecting channel (elevation 29 m), the salinities can be expected to diverge further. Under current conditions, the eastern basin may receive water from the Amu Darya in wet years, fluctuating in salinity and flooding an area of up to 4500 km2 in salt water to a depth of about one meter, which would preclude any economic activity in the area, while the western basin becomes increasingly saline. Water diversion from the Amu Darya directly to the deeper western basin could lower its salinity enough to allow resumption of local fisheries, while allowing the eastern basin to desiccate almost entirely and avoiding the problems of flooding.

Current situation
The Eastern Sea dried up completely in the summer of 2009, apart from the small permanent Barsakelmes Lake (between the Northern and Western seas), but it received some water from snow melt in the spring of 2010. It is expected to alternate between complete desiccation in the summers and the occasional flood from the Amu Darya or spillover from the dam holding back the North Aral Sea, though a second dike, begun in 2010, may reduce the incidence of the latter.

In 2015, the Western Sea was starting to split into two, as the channel that connects the central part of the sea and the small North-Eastern part was growing skinnier. (This can be seen on the 2014 picture.) Since 2018, the split has been complete.

References

Aral Sea
Lakes of Kazakhstan
Lakes of Uzbekistan